The Third Cabinet of Lee Hsien Loong of the Government of Singapore came into existence on 21 May 2011 following the 2011 general election. While many of its members were retained from the previous government, Heng Swee Keat and Chan Chun Sing, who had both just been elected, were given ministerial appointments.

With effect from 1 August 2012, Grace Fu became only the second woman in Singapore's history to be made a full minister by being appointed a Minister in the Prime Minister's Office. (The first was Lim Hwee Hua.) From 1 November, Chan Chun Sing assumed the designation of Acting Minister for Social and Family Development, while Lawrence Wong was brought into the Cabinet for the first time as Acting Minister for Culture, Community and Youth.

Initial composition

Cabinet
At the 2011 general election, Senior Minister Shunmugam Jayakumar did not contest his seat as part of the East Coast Group Representation Constituency and thus retired from the Cabinet. Foreign Minister George Yeo and Minister in the Prime Minister's Office Lim Hwee Hua contested Aljunied GRC unsuccessfully, and were defeated by a team from the Workers' Party of Singapore.

Following the election, on 14 May 2011, Minister Mentor Lee Kuan Yew and Senior Minister Goh Chok Tong tendered their resignations from the Cabinet, stating that they wished to give the Prime Minister a "fresh clean slate" in forming the Government and enable him to "have a completely younger team of ministers to connect to and engage with this young generation". Goh was given the honorary title of Emeritus Senior Minister; the same title was offered to Lee but he declined. Lee and Goh were appointed as senior advisers to the Government of Singapore Investment Corporation (GIC) and the Monetary Authority of Singapore (MAS) respectively.

Four days later, on 18 May, Prime Minister Lee Hsien Loong announced a new Cabinet line-up. In addition to Lee Kuan Yew, Goh Chok Tong, George Yeo and Lim Hwee Hua, four other ministers retired: Wong Kan Seng, Mah Bow Tan, Lim Boon Heng and Raymond Lim. Two ministers, Lim Hng Kiang and Lim Swee Say, retained their respective Trade and Industry and Prime Minister's Office portfolios, while existing ministers were appointed to new positions in the remaining 11 ministries. Tharman Shanmugaratnam was promoted to Deputy Prime Minister and appointed Minister for Manpower in addition to his portfolio of Minister for Finance, replacing Wong Kan Seng. S. Iswaran, formerly Senior Minister of State for Education and for Trade and Industry, was elevated to the Cabinet as Minister in the Prime Minister's Office, and Second Minister for Home Affairs and for Trade and Industry. Heng Swee Keat and Chan Chun Sing, both elected to Parliament for the first time, were respectively assigned the posts of Minister for Education, and Acting Minister for Community Development, Youth and Sports and Minister of State for the Ministry of Information, Communications and the Arts. Heng was the first new MP directly appointed a full minister since 1984.

With effect from 21 May 2011, the Cabinet of Singapore consisted of the following persons:

Ministers of State and Parliamentary Secretaries
Where Ministers of State and Parliamentary Secretaries were concerned, new appointments were made following the 2011 general election, including the appointment of three newly elected MPs: Sim Ann, Tan Chuan-Jin and Lawrence Wong. Backbenchers Halimah Yacob and Josephine Teo were made Ministers of State. With effect from 21 May 2011 the following Members of Parliament were appointed as Ministers of State and Parliamentary Secretaries:

Reshuffles

As of 1 August and 1 November 2012
On 31 July 2012, Prime Minister Lee Hsien Loong announced several changes to his Cabinet and other appointments. With effect from 1 August, Grace Fu was promoted to Minister in the Prime Minister's Office, the second woman to be appointed a full minister in Singapore. Tharman Shanmugaratnam and Lui Tuck Yew relinquished their respective appointments as Minister for Manpower and Second Minister for Foreign Affairs to Tan Chuan-Jin and Grace Fu, while Yaacob Ibrahim became Minister for Communications and Information. With effect from 1 November, Chan Chun Sing was redesignated Acting Minister for Social and Family Development, while Lawrence Wong was brought into the Cabinet for the first time as Acting Minister for Culture, Community and Youth.

Thus, as of 1 November 2012, the composition of the Cabinet was as follows:

The following changes to the Ministers of State and Parliamentary Secretaries were also made with effect from 1 August 2012 (or 1 November, if so indicated):

As of 1 September 2013
On 28 August 2013, Prime Minister Lee Hsien Loong announced several changes to his Cabinet and other appointments. With effect from 1 September, Chan Chun Sing was promoted to the full Minister and will continue to helm the Ministry of Social and Family Development. Mr. Chan was also appointed the second minister for the Ministry of Defence. Tan Chuan-Jin relinquished his appointment as Senior Minister of State in the Ministry of National Development while maintaining his post as an acting Manpower minister.

Thus, as of 1 September 2013, the composition of the Cabinet was as follows:

Changes to the Ministers of State and Parliamentary Secretaries were also made with effect from 1 September 2013. Amy Khor and Josephine Teo were promoted to Senior Minister of State while Mohamad Maliki Osman, Sim Ann and Desmond Lee were given the post of Minister of State in their respective ministries. Low Yen Ling was appointed Parliamentary Secretary in the Ministry of Social and Family Development from 1 October 2013 onwards.

As of 1 May 2014
Changes to the Cabinet and other appointments were announced by Prime Minister Lee Hsien Loong on 29 April 2014. With effect from 1 May, Tan Chuan-Jin and Lawrence Wong were promoted to full ministers of the Ministry of Manpower and Ministry of Culture, Community and Youth respectively. Tan relinquished his appointment as Senior Minister of State in the Ministry of National Development.

Changes to the Ministers of State and Parliamentary Secretaries were also made with effect from 1 May 2014. Sam Tan relinquished his appointment in the Ministry of Foreign Affairs upon being promoted to Minister of State for the Prime Minister's Office and for the Ministry of Culture, Community and Youth. Dr. Lam Pin Min was appointed Minister of State for Health with effect from 1 August, while Low Yen Ling was appointed Parliamentary Secretary for the Ministry of Culture, Community and Youth in addition to her current portfolio in the Ministry of Social and Family Development from 1 May.

Source: .

As of 9 April and 4 May 2015
Changes to the Cabinet and other appointments were announced on 8 April 2015. With effect from 9 April, Chan Chun Sing relinquished his posts of Minister for Social and Family Development and Second Minister for Defence to become a Minister in the Prime Minister's Office. Tan Chuan-Jin became Minister for Social and Family Development and will relinquish his post of Minister for Manpower on 4 May. Lim Swee Say will take over as Manpower Minister on that date. Lui Tuck Yew, currently Minister for Transport, took on the additional post of Second Minister for Defence as of 9 April. Masagos Zulkifli was promoted to full minister as a Minister in the Prime Minister's Office. This is the first time there are two Malay full ministers in the Cabinet, the other being Yaacob Ibrahim.

Source: .

As Masagos Zulkifli was also promoted to Second Minister for Home Affairs and Foreign Affairs, he has ceased to be a Senior Minister of State in these ministries.

Sources: ; .

Summary

References 

Executive branch of the government of Singapore
Lists of political office-holders in Singapore
Cabinets established in 2011